Jim Lewis (born James Lewis Slayden; 5 June 1941 at  9:30 a.m. in Yonkers, NY) was an astrologer, writer and entrepreneur.  He is best known for pioneering the technique of Astrocartography.

Astro*Carto*Graphy

Locational astrology is an old concept, but Lewis expanded a little-known field, using detailed maps and modern software. In 1979, Lewis published his first edition of his annual Sourcebook of Mundane Maps. His theories were subsequently developed by other authors.

Lewis eventually patented his system and trademarked the term 'Astro*Carto*Graphy® (A*C*G)'. This registration is still maintained by the Astro*Carto*Graphy Living Trust. A non-profit division of the Astro*Carto*Graphy Trust—Continuum: the Jim Slayden Lewis Foundation—lists over 20 book titles including those by Lewis that are either devoted to Astro*Carto*Graphy or where the technique features extensively.

For his original work in developing and promoting the technique of Astrocartography, Lewis received the Marc Edmund Jones award in 1978 and the Regulus Award for discovery, innovation, and research at the United Astrology Congress in Washington, DC 1992.

Lecturer and teacher
Lewis regularly conducted seminars in which he trained students in Astro*Carto*Graphy techniques.  He later went on to administer a certification exam.  Candidates who passed his stringent qualifications were given a certificate as a professional Astro*Carto*Grapher. As of February 2008, Continuum listed 88 certified practitioners around the world.

Lewis lectured throughout the world.  However, in his travels he was not immune to the negative potential of A*C*G's ‘planetary power lines’. In the mid 1980s he was struck by a vehicle while crossing Military Road in Sydney, Australia, which is on his Mars Ascending line.

Personal

Jim lived in San Francisco for most of his life. At age 53, he died from an aggressive brain cancer; his ashes were spread at Big Sur.

Selected publications

 The Astro*Carto*Graphy Book of Maps- The Astrology of Relocation (1981) with Ariel Guttman.  Llewellyn Publications; 1st edition   Out of print
 The Psychology of Astro*Carto*Graphy (Contemporary Astrology), (posthumous)(1997) with Kenneth Irving. Penguin Arkana   . Revised edition (Words and Things, 2012) .
 The Future of Astrology (1985) Edited by A T Mann; A T Mann, Karen Hamaker-Zondag, Dane Rudhyar, Robert Hand, John Addey, Jim Lewis, Roger Elliot, Bruno & Louise Huber, Michel Gauquelin, Dennis Elwell, Layla Rael, Alan Oken. Allen & Unwin: London.  (Revised edition Cosimo, Inc. 2004) Chapter 9 by Jim Lewis. And the future will be nothing less than the flowering of our inwardness. pp. 115–130

See also
 Astrology
 Astrocartography
 Locational Astrology

References

External links
Astro*Carto*Graphy main page
The Jim Lewis Slayden Foundation

1941 births
1995 deaths
American astrologers
American astrological writers
20th-century astrologers
20th-century American non-fiction writers
20th-century American male writers
American male non-fiction writers